Unitus Labs a successor of Unitus Inc., is a non-profit micro-credit organization that worked to provide credit lines to aid in development, especially in India.  It was heavily involved with SKS Microfinance. It was originally organized in 2001, and is based in Seattle, Washington with office in Bengaluru, India. 

Unitus largely works as a consultant organization working with other organizations that are micro-credit providers.

In 2011 they launched Unitus Seed Fund which works to back businesses in India, one of which is a school system providing education to the rural poor in India.

In 2010, they also helped launch Patamar Capital (formerly known as Unitus Impact) to invest in companies to increase incomes and improve the lives of low-income communities in South and Southeast Asia using innovative business models.

Sources

Non-profit kingdom article on Unitus
article on Unitus
Social Enterprise Buzz article on Unitus Seed Fund

External links
 Unitus Labs, website

Organizations established in 2001
Microfinance organizations
Organizations based in Seattle